Lake St. Martin First Nation is a First Nations government and Treaty 2 signatory.

When a massive flood hit Manitoba, the Government of Manitoba decided to divert water to Lake St. Martin in order to protect cottage, and agricultural properties on other bodies of water. As a result all the housing at Lake St. Martin First Nation was destroyed. As of 2019, approximately 1,000 flood evacuees are still displaced.

Reserves
The Narrows 49 
The Narrows 49A

References

First Nations governments in Manitoba